The 2021 Campeonato Brasileiro Série D was a football competition held in Brazil, equivalent to the fourth division. The competition began on 26 May and ended on 13 November 2021.

Sixty-eight teams competed in the tournament. Sixty-four teams qualified from their state leagues and cups, and four relegated from the 2020 Campeonato Brasileiro Série C (Boa Esporte, Imperatriz, São Bento and Treze).

The match Imperatriz v 4 de Julho, played at the Estádio Frei Epifânio D'Abadia (Imperatriz) on 28 August 2021 (Group A2 13th round), was finished in the 76th minute (0–0) after a strong storm caused the partial collapse of the grandstand roof located over the press booths and changing rooms of the teams and referees.

ABC, Aparecidense, Atlético Cearense and Campinense qualified for the semi-finals and were promoted to the 2022 Campeonato Brasileiro Série C.

In the finals, Aparecidense defeated Campinense 2–1 on aggregate to win their first title.

Teams

Federation ranking
The number of teams from each state was chosen based on the CBF State Ranking.

Participating teams
Teams in italic played the preliminary stage. The teams were:

Competition format
In the preliminary stage, eight teams from the worst ranked federations in the CBF ranking were drawn into four ties, with the winners of each tie advancing to the group stage. In the group stage, the remaining 60 teams and the 4 four teams qualified from the preliminary stage were divided into eight groups of eight organized regionally. Top four teams qualified for the round of 32. From the round of 32 on the competition was played as a knock-out tournament with each round contested over two legs.

Preliminary stage
It was played from 26 to 30 May. The lowest-seeded teams from the eight worst ranked federations in the 2021 CBF ranking (Piauí, Distrito Federal, Espírito Santo, Mato Grosso do Sul, Rondônia, Roraima, Tocantins and Amapá) competed to decide four places in the group stage.

Each tie was played on a home-and-away two-legged basis. If tied on aggregate, the away goals rule would not be used, extra time would not be played, and the penalty shoot-out would be used to determine the winners (Regulations Article 18).

Matches

|}

Group stage
In the group stage, each group was played on a home-and-away round-robin basis. The teams were ranked according to points (3 points for a win, 1 point for a draw, and 0 points for a loss). If tied on points, the following criteria would be used to determine the ranking: 1. Wins; 2. Goal difference; 3. Goals scored; 4. Head-to-head (if the tie was only between two teams); 5. Fewest red cards; 6. Fewest yellow cards; 7. Draw in the headquarters of the Brazilian Football Confederation (Regulations Article 13).

The top four teams qualified for the round of 32.

Group A1

Group A2

Group A3

Group A4

Group A5

Group A6

Group A7

Group A8

Final stages
The final stages were played on a home-and-away two-legged basis. For the round of 16, semi-finals and finals, the best-overall-performance team hosted the second leg. If tied on aggregate, the away goals rule would not be used, extra time would not be played, and the penalty shoot-out would be used to determine the winners (Regulations Article 18).

For the quarter-finals, teams were seeded based on the table of results of all matches in the competition. The top four seeded teams played the second leg at home.

The four quarter-finals winners were promoted to 2022 Série C.

Round of 32
The round of 32 was a two-legged knockout tie, with the draw regionalised. The matches were played from 11 to 20 September.

Matches

|}

Round of 16
The matches were played from 25 September to 3 October.

Matches

|}

Quarter-finals
The draw for the quarter-finals was seeded based on the table of results of all matches in the competition (except preliminary stage matches) for the qualifying teams. The teams were ranked according to points. If tied on points, the following criteria would be used to determine the ranking: 1. Wins; 2. Goal difference; 3. Goals scored; 4. Fewest red cards; 5. Fewest yellow cards; 6. Draw in the headquarters of the Brazilian Football Confederation (Regulations Article 15).

Quarter-finals seedings

Matches
The matches were played from 9 to 17 October.

|}

Semi-finals
The matches were played from 23 to 31 October.

Matches

|}

Finals
The matches were played on 6 and 13 November.

Matches

|}

Top goalscorers

References 

Campeonato Brasileiro Série D seasons
2